{{DISPLAYTITLE:C19H21NO4}}
The molecular formula C19H21NO4 (molar mass : 327.37 g/mol) may refer to :
 Acetylmorphone, a semi-synthetic opiate analogue
 Boldine
 Isoteolin (isoboldine)
 3-Monoacetylmorphine
 6-Monoacetylmorphine
 Naloxone
 (+)-Naloxone
 Salutaridine
 Scoulerine
 Stepholidine